Yuki Yamada may refer to:

Yuki Yamada (actor) (born 1990), Japanese actor
Yuki Yamada (darts player) (born 1983), Japanese darts player
Yuki Yamada (bowler), Japanese ten-pin bowler competing in the Bowling Revolution P-League